

References

A